"We're the Chipmunks" is a song performed by the fictional group Alvin and the Chipmunks. It serves as the theme song for their animated series in 1983 and 2015. A remixed version was recorded in 2008 for the Chipmunks' album Undeniable.

References

Alvin and the Chipmunks songs
1983 songs
Theme music
Songs about mammals